Fort York is an historic site of military fortifications in Toronto, Ontario, Canada.

Fort York may also refer to:

 Fort York (provincial electoral district), former provincial electoral district in Toronto, Ontario, Canada from 1987 to 1999 
 Fort York (neighbourhood), located along and south of CN and CP railway corridors in Toronto, Ontario, Canada
 Fort York Armoury, Canadian Forces facility in Toronto, Ontario, Canada
 Fort York, North Carolina, used during the American Civil War 
 Fort York (HBC vessel), operated by the HBC from 1914-1930, see Hudson's Bay Company vessels